Uptown Christiansburg (formerly New River Valley Mall) is an enclosed shopping mall in Christiansburg, Virginia, United States. Opened in 1988, it features Kohl's, Belk, Homegoods, and Dick's Sporting Goods as its major anchor stores.

History
The mall opened in 1988. Built by Crown American, it originally featured Hess's, J. C. Penney, Sears, and Leggett (now Belk). The mall struggled with vacancy for several years, and was only at 75 percent occupancy for most of the 1990s. In response to this, PREIT, which bought most of the Crown American portfolio, renovated the center throughout the 21st century. Renovations included expansion of the Belk space and a new Dick's Sporting Goods store, replacing Peebles which was operating out of the former Hess's space. A vacated movie theater was also turned into a food court and a satellite campus of New River Community College.

Sears closed in 2014, and was replaced by Kohl's a year later. In 2016, Farallon Capital Management acquired the mall from PREIT, and hired CBL & Associates Properties to manage it. After J.C.Penney closed its store at the mall in 2017, the space was renovated to accommodate a new Ulta, Homegoods, and Kirklands. Planet Fitness announced in 2018 that it would open in the Kohl's wing. Farallon Capital Management sold the mall to RockStep Capital for $21.6 million in Fall 2019. New River Valley Mall was renamed to Uptown Christiansburg in July 2020.

References

External links
 Uptown Christiansburg official website

Shopping malls in Virginia
Buildings and structures in Montgomery County, Virginia
Tourist attractions in Montgomery County, Virginia
Shopping malls established in 1988
1988 establishments in Virginia